Anar Rud Borzog (also Romanized as Anār Rūd Borzog; also known as Anār Rūd and Anārūd) is a village in Miyankuh-e Sharqi Rural District, Mamulan District, Pol-e Dokhtar County, Lorestan Province, Iran. At the 2006 census, its population was 126, in 23 families.

References 

Towns and villages in Pol-e Dokhtar County